The Men's 1991 World Amateur Boxing Championships were held in Sydney, Australia, from November 15 to 23. The sixth edition of this competition, held nearly a year before the Summer Olympics in Barcelona, Spain, was organised by the world's governing body for amateur boxing, AIBA.

Medal table

Medal winners

See also

External links
Results on Amateur Boxing

World Amateur Boxing Championships
AIBA World Boxing Championships
International boxing competitions hosted by Australia
Boxing Championships
Sports competitions in Sydney
November 1991 sports events in Australia
1990s in Sydney